1997 Emmy Awards may refer to:

 49th Primetime Emmy Awards, the 1997 Emmy Awards ceremony honoring primetime programming during June 1996 – May 1997
 24th Daytime Emmy Awards, the 1997 Emmy Awards ceremony honoring daytime programming during 1996
 25th International Emmy Awards, honoring international programming

Emmy Award ceremonies by year